The team jumping at the 1976 Summer Olympics took place on 1 August. The event was open to men and women. The individual show jumping event consisted of two rounds, held separately from the team competition. The team show jumping event consisted of two rounds, held separately from the individual competition.  The top 8 teams from the first round qualified for the second round.  Each rider on the team rides the course the rider with the most faults, score is thrown out, the remaining score are added up to determine the total points.  This was repeated in the second round, both rounds were then added together to determine placement, if tied a jump-off between all tied teams would determine the winners.

Results

References

Equestrian at the 1976 Summer Olympics